This is a list of colleges and universities in Turkmenistan.

Major public institutions 
Unless noted otherwise, institutions in this table are located in the city of Ashgabat.

Specialized Institutions
These institutions require applicants to have graduated from a standard secondary school, and thus are post-secondary institutions.

Art schools
 Ahal Province Special School of Art, Ashgabat
 Balkan Province Special School of Art, Balkanabat
 Lebap Province Special School of Art, Turkmenabat
 Magtymguly Garlyyev Dashoguz Special School of Art, Dashoguz

Banking
 Hero Atamyrat Nyyazow Specialized Banking School

Merchant Marine
 Turkmenbashy Marine Secondary Vocational School, Türkmenbaşy

Music schools
 Danatar Ovezov Turkmen State Special School of Music, Ashgabat
 Yolaman Hummayev Mary Special School of Music, Mary

Nursing and paramedic schools
 Balkan Medical School, Balkanabat
 Gurbansoltan Eje Dashoguz Medical School, Dashoguz
 Indira Gandhi Ashgabat Medical School, Ashgabat
 S.A. Niyazov Mary Medical School, Mary
 Turkmenabat Medical School, Turkmenabat

Pedagogical schools
 Aman Kekilov Pedagogical School, Ashgabat
 Beki Seytakov Pedagogical School, Dashoguz
 Hydyr Deryayev Pedagogical School, Mary

Military and security institutions 

 Great Saparmurat Turkmenbashy Military Institute
 Turkmenistan Internal Affairs Ministry Institute
 Turkmenistan Military Academy

 Turkmenistan National Security Institute
 Turkmenistan Naval Institute
 Turkmenistan Police Academy
 Turkmenistan State Border Service Institute

Closed institutions 
International Turkmen-Turkish University (1994 — 2016) 
Turkmen State Institute of Transport and Communications (1992 — 2019) 
 Branch of Gubkin Russian State University of Oil and Gas (2008 — 2012)

References 

Turkmenistan
 
Universities
Turkmenistan

Universities